Team Sapura Cycling is a Malaysian UCI Continental cycling team founded in 2017 with major backing from Sapura Holdings Berhad, a renowned conglomerate from Malaysia.

Team roster

Major wins

2017
Stage 3 Tour de Lombok, Jahir Perez
Stage 2 Tour de Molvccas, Akmal Hakim Zakaria
Stage 4 Jelajah Malaysia, Jahir Perez

2018
Stage 1 Tour of Indonesia, Dylan Page
Prologue Tour of Cartier, Mario Vogt
Stage 2 Tour de Lombok, Muhamad Zawawi Azman
Stage 3 Tour de Siak, Mohamad Izzat Hilmi Abdul Halil
Stage 4 Tour de Siak, Akmal Hakim Zakaria
Stage 3 Tour de Ijen, Jesse Ewart
Overall Tour de Singkarak, Jesse Ewart
Stage 3, Jesse Ewart

2019
Oceania Continental Championships, Road Race, Benjamin Dyball
Oceania Continental Championships, Time Trial, Benjamin Dyball
Stage 1 Tour de Tochigi, Benjamin Dyball
Overall Tour de Langkawi, Benjamin Dyball
Stage 1, Marcus Culey
Stage 4, Benjamin Dyball
Overall Tour de Iskandar Johor, Mario Vogt
Stage 2, Cristian Raileanu
Stage 4 Tour of Taiyuan, Cristian Raileanu
Stages 2 & 5 Tour de Filipinas, Mario Vogt
 National Time Trial Championships, Muhsin Al Redha Misbah
 National Time Trial Championships, Cristian Raileanu
 National Road Race Championships, Cristian Raileanu
Stage 7 (ITT) Tour of Qinghai Lake, Ben Dyball
Stage 3 Tour of Indonesia, Marcus Culey
Stage 5 Tour of Indonesia, Ben Dyball
Stage 5 Tour of Peninsular, Cristian Raileanu
Overall Tour de Singkarak, Jesse Ewart
Stages 1 & 2, Jesse Ewart
Stage 4, Cristian Raileanu
Stage 9, Muhamad Zawawi Azman
Overall Tour de Selangor, Marcus Culey
Stages 1, 2, 3 & 4, Marcus Culey

2020
Overall Tour de Langkawi, Danilo Celano
 National Road Race Championships, Serghei Țvetcov
 National Time Trial Championships, Cristian Raileanu
 National Road Race Championships, Cristian Raileanu
 National Time Trial Championships, Nur Aiman Rosli
 National Road Race Championships, Akmal Hakim Zakaria

2021
 National Time Trial Championships, Ahmet Örken
 National Time Trial Championships, Nur Aiman Rosli

Continental & national champions

2019
 Oceanian Time Trial, Ben Dyball
 Oceanian Road Race, Ben Dyball
 Malaysian Time Trial, Muhsin Al Redha Misbah
 Moldavian Time Trial, Cristian Raileanu
 Moldavian Road Race, Cristian Raileanu
2020
 Romanian Time Trial, Serghei Țvetcov
 Moldavian Time Trial, Cristian Raileanu
 Moldavian Road Race, Cristian Raileanu
 Malaysian Time Trial, Nur Aiman Rosli
 Malaysian Road Race, Akmal Hakim Zakaria
2021
 Turkey Time Trial, Ahmet Örken
 Moldavian Time Trial, Cristian Raileanu
 Malaysian Time Trial, Nur Aiman Rosli
 Malaysian Road Race, Mohamad Saari Amri Abd Rasim
2022
 Malaysian Time Trial, Nur Aiman Rosli
 Malaysian Road Race, Muhsin Al Redha Misbah
 Malaysian U23 Road Race, Mior Muhammad Hazwan Hamzah

References

External links

UCI Continental Teams (Asia)
Cycling teams established in 2017
Cycling teams based in Malaysia